Huron High School may refer to:

 Huron High School (Ann Arbor, Michigan), USA
 Huron High School (New Boston, Michigan), USA
 Huron High School (Ohio), Huron, Ohio, USA
 Huron Institute, a defunct highschool in Milan, Ohio, USA
 Huron High School (South Dakota) — Huron, South Dakota, USA

See also
 Huron (disambiguation)